The Building at 1401–1407 Elmwood Avenue is a historic rowhouse building at 1401–1407 Elmwood Avenue in Evanston, Illinois. Built in 1890, the three-story building includes four rowhouse units. It was one of several rowhouses built in the late nineteenth century in Evanston; these rowhouses were a precursor to Evanston's many suburban apartments, which also offered house-like living in a multi-unit setting. Architect Stephen A. Jennings, a prominent Evanston architect who designed several of Evanston's large single-family homes, designed the building. The building's design includes a large central gable, enclosed porches supported by arches on the corner units, porches with shed roofs on the central units, and a bracketed wooden cornice.

The building was added to the National Register of Historic Places on March 15, 1984.

References

Buildings and structures on the National Register of Historic Places in Cook County, Illinois
Residential buildings on the National Register of Historic Places in Illinois
Buildings and structures in Evanston, Illinois
Residential buildings completed in 1890